Tuiquimamel is a village in the municipality of Tajumulco, Guatemala, with a warm, temperate climate.

Populated places in Guatemala